Triple M Southwest is an adult contemporary-formatted commercial radio station, owned and operated by Southern Cross Austereo. Based in Bunbury, Western Australia, it covers the south west of the state via a number of high-powered AM stations. It was previously known as RadioWest before a network wide rebranding to Triple M in late 2016.

Presenters

Current
Local programming is produced and broadcast from Triple M's studios in Bunbury from 5:30am-4pm on weekdays.

The station's local presenters include Allan Aldworth, Cliff Reeve, Dan Leach and Suze McGill.

Former
 Noel Brunning (Seven News)
 Ian Blackley (6iX)
 Darren de Mello (6MM)
 Chris Ilsley (6PR)
 Ashley Dillon (Spirit Radio Network)
 Chris Parsons
 Vin Dawes
 Wayne Taylor
 Paul Cook (ABC Great Southern)
 Jamie McDonald
 Allan Aldworth (Hit WA)

Transmitters
Triple M South West is broadcast via 4 full power stations:

In addition, the 4 full power stations feed a further 2 repeater stations.

References

Radio stations in Western Australia
Classic hits radio stations in Australia
South West (Western Australia)
Radio stations established in 2000